Theodor Sparkuhl (October 7, 1894, Hannover, Germany – June 13, 1946, Los Angeles, California) was a German-born cinematographer with 140 movies to his credit.

Sparkuhl began his career as a projectionist in 1911. He was trained as a newsreel cameraman at the German subsidiary of the French film production company Gaumont in 1912. During World War I he chronicled battles in the Middle East and in Russia. In 1916 he became a lighting director of feature films, working in the German film industry until 1928.  He shot twelve films under the direction of Ernst Lubitsch, a collaboration that ended with Lubitsch's emigration to Hollywood in 1922.

From 1928 to 1930 Sparkuhl worked for British International Pictures in London. He relocated to France in 1930, and worked on a number of films, including films directed by Jean Renoir and Marc Allégret. In December 1931 he and his family finally emigrated to Hollywood. He soon signed a contract with Paramount Pictures, where he worked until 1945.

Sparkuhl's most famous films include Renoir's La Chienne (1931), the classic adventure film Beau Geste (1939) and the seminal film noir The Glass Key (1942). The distinctive low-key photography in the latter film and his two other early film noirs Among the Living (1941) and Street of Chance (1942) is a remarkable change from the traditional flat lighting of the typical Hollywood crime films of the 1930s (like the 1935 film version of The Glass Key). Film historians consider Sparkuhl's work in these three films to be a significant contribution to the development of the archetypical noir style and an indication of its debt to German Expressionism and French Poetic realism.

Selected filmography

External links

References

German cinematographers
1894 births
1946 deaths
University of Bonn alumni
Film people from Hanover
German emigrants to the United States